The 2014 Belgium GP2 Series round was a GP2 Series motor race held on August 23 and 24, 2014 at the Circuit de Spa-Francorchamps in Belgium. It is the sixth round of the 2014 GP2 Season. The race weekend supported the 2014 Belgian Grand Prix.

See also 
 2014 Belgian Grand Prix
 2014 Spa-Francorchamps GP3 Series round

2014 GP2 Series rounds
GP2